Nieuwerkerken Castle is a castle in Nieuwerkerken, Belgium.

See also
List of castles in Belgium

External links

Nieuwkerken Castle, www.belgiancastles.be

Castles in Belgium
Castles in Limburg (Belgium)